St Mary of Furness is a Roman Catholic church located on Duke Street in Barrow-in-Furness, England. The congregation was founded in 1858, however the current building was constructed between 1866 and 1867. It is a Grade II listed building.

History

It was built with £6,000 donated by Spencer Cavendish the 8th Duke of Devonshire. Designed by English architect E. W. Pugin, the spacious church originally seated 800, but has now been expanded to accommodate around 1,000 worshippers. In 1976 St. Mary of Furness and the church presbytery were granted Grade II listed status by Historic England.

The church's organ contains approximately 3,000 pipes and was originally built by Messrs. Hill and Son for the Royal Liverpool Philharmonic Society. The spire of St. Mary of Furness wasn't added to the church until 1888, despite being a key component of the original plans.

The church was placed on Historic England's Heritage at Risk Register as a result of stone decay to the spire. Repair work was subsequently undertaken in 2015 financed by the Heritage Lottery Fund and Places of Worship scheme.

See also
 Listed buildings in Barrow-in-Furness
 List of places of worship in Barrow-in-Furness

References

External links

 Our Lady of Furness Parish site

Saint Mary
Grade II listed churches in Cumbria
Roman Catholic churches in Cumbria
Grade II listed Roman Catholic churches in England
19th-century Roman Catholic church buildings in the United Kingdom
Roman Catholic Diocese of Lancaster
E. W. Pugin church buildings